Bonyad Kandi (also Romanized as Bonyād Kandī) is a village in Charuymaq-e Sharqi Rural District, Shadian District, Charuymaq County, East Azerbaijan Province, Iran. At the 2006 census, its population was 156, in 21 families.

References 

Populated places in Charuymaq County